The Jong's Crocodile Farm and Zoo is a crocodile farm in Siburan, Kuching Division, Sarawak, Malaysia. It was originally started by Yong Kian Sen when he started to collect crocodiles in 1963. In 1979, his family purchased 1 hectare of land in Siburan for their crocodile farm. The crocodile farm and zoo is divided into barking deer, bear, bird, crocodile, deer, fish pond, monitor lizard, owl and eagle, porcupine and wild boar sections. The crocodile farm and zoo is opened everyday from 11:00 a.m. to 3:00 p.m.

See also
 List of tourist attractions in Malaysia

References

External links

 

1979 establishments in Malaysia
Buildings and structures in Kuching
Crocodile farms in Malaysia
Tourist attractions in Sarawak